Lone Tree Township, Nebraska may refer to one of the following places:

 Lone Tree Township, Clay County, Nebraska
 Lone Tree Township, Merrick County, Nebraska

See also
Lone Tree Township (disambiguation)

Nebraska township disambiguation pages